Artem Sergeyvich Ermakov  (born 16 March 1982) is a Russian male volleyball player. He was part of the Russia men's national volleyball team at the 2014 FIVB Volleyball Men's World Championship in Poland. He played for Dinamo Moscow.

References

External links
 
 
 

1982 births
Living people
Russian men's volleyball players
Place of birth missing (living people)
Olympic volleyball players of Russia
Volleyball players at the 2016 Summer Olympics
Ural Ufa volleyball players
VC Belogorie players
20th-century Russian people
21st-century Russian people